Zhovtyak is a surname of Ukrainian origin.

Notable
 Volodymyr Zhovtyak (born 1973), Ukrainian social activist, human rights defender

Ukrainian-language surnames
Surnames of Ukrainian origin